Robert J. Haiman was a nationally recognized reporter for the St. Petersburg Times.  He served in this capacity for 25 years, and eventually he was promoted to executive editor.  Later Haiman served as the President of the Poynter Institute for Media Studies, and was in this position until 1996.

Education
Haiman received his Bachelor's degree from the University of Florida back in 1958.

External links
Biography Listed
About his Presidency at Poynter

University of Florida alumni
1937 births
Living people